The Malay Mail is a newspaper in Kuala Lumpur, Malaysia, first published on 1 December 1896 when Kuala Lumpur was the capital of the then new Federated Malay States, making it the first daily newspaper to appear in the FMS. As of May 2014, it is a free lunchtime paper with 100,000 copies circulated around the Klang Valley. Their main target audiences are Professionals, Managers, Executives and Businessmen (PMEBs).

During World War II, the paper was replaced by the Malai Sinpo.

Overview 
The newspaper used to be an afternoon edition which focused on local happenings and was promoted as "The Paper That Cares". It was common to find local community news making the headlines. The paper also had featured a "Page 3 Girl" and was not taken too seriously as it had the image of a tabloid with the printing of many unsubstantiated news articles. The newspaper had a commanding presence in classified ads and in the 1990s it was common to find almost half the newspapers comprising classified ads.

In 1997, the Malay Mail was the NSTP Berhad's single most profitable unit through its grip on classifieds which, in the nature of a virtuous cycle, actually intensified its popularity.

When the Asian financial crisis broke from 1997 to 1998, another daily newspaper, The Star offered huge discounts to property agents and car dealers – the ones most affected by the crisis. The Malay Mail could not, or would not, offer such rebates – which prompted a shift to The Star with the Malay Mail losing its position as the leading classifieds newspaper. Once readers moved, The Star′s massive circulation ensured that they would stay, and the Malay Mail′s circulation plummeted.

The Malay Mail was linked to another daily newspaper, the New Straits Times via its holding company, the NSTP Berhad.

During the turn of the millennium, the New Straits Times was facing increasing competition from another daily newspaper, The Star. At the time, the NSTP Berhad had a whole range of newspapers including the New Straits Times, the New Sunday Times, the Malay Mail, the Sunday Mail, Berita Harian and its Sunday edition Berita Minggu and the late-morning Malay-language tabloids Harian Metro and Metro Ahad.

A strategic decision was made by the NSTP Berhad to focus on only one English newspaper, which was the New Straits Times. On 1 September 2004, the New Straits Times introduced the publishing of two versions of the newspaper – a tabloid-size daily along with the broadsheet format. This signalled their intention to go head-on with The Star which printed tabloid-sized newspapers. The senior reporters from the Malay Mail were transferred to the New Straits Times and the nationwide circulation of the Malay Mail was reduced and limited to the Klang Valley.

In the early stages of 2005, plans were unveiled to change the direction of the paper and offered voluntary separation scheme to senior writers and journalists of the Malay Mail. Its former weekend edition, The Sunday Mail, published its last edition on 8 May 2005. After some experiments that went awry in 2006 and 2007, the NSTP decided to sell the paper to Media Prima Berhad.

The newspaper's circulation slid from its peak of over 60,000 in the mid-1980s. Advertising revenue has kept in step, plummeting to RM10 million annually from its peak of RM70 million in 1997. Advertising revenue has since been declining and the business has been reporting losses.

Media Prima Berhad relaunched the Malay Mail on 5 May 2006 as a free afternoon paper but still failed to overturn its losses.
It was then sold to Datuk Ibrahim Mohd Nor of Blue Inc who tried a free model under the stewardship of Datuk ‘Rocky’ Ahiruddin Attan with an emphasis towards Klang Valley news in 2008 but that too failed.
The newspaper was then sold to a group of businessmen led by Dato’ Siew Ka Wei of the Ancom Group of Companies in 2012. It also marked Siew's entry into the media world by setting up the Redberry Media Group with advertising assets at airports, buses, cinemas and billboards.
Malay Mail shares some common shareholders with Redberry and Ancom. Besides Siew, the other directors of Malay Mail are Tan Sri Mohd Al Amin Abdul Majid and Datuk Rocky.
In 2013, the Malay Mail Online website (www.themalaymailonline.com) was launched and proved to be a hit for those seeking independent news.

In 2018, the website was revamped and relaunched as www.malaymail.com. The Chinese and Malay language news portals were revamped into Cincai News and ProjekMM.  

On 25 October 2018,  Malay Mail announced that it will cease its print operations on 1 December 2018 and go fully digital on 2 December 2018.

See also 

 List of newspapers in Malaysia

References

External links 
 

1896 establishments in British Malaya
Online newspapers with defunct print editions
English-language newspapers published in Asia
Newspapers published in Malaysia
Publications established in 1896
Publications disestablished in 2018
Mass media in Kuala Lumpur
2008 mergers and acquisitions
2012 mergers and acquisitions